Parliamentary elections were held in Norway in 1885. The result was a victory for the Liberal Party, which won 84 of the 114 seats in the Storting. Johan Sverdrup remained Prime Minister.

Results

References

General elections in Norway
19th-century elections in Norway
Norway
Parliament